Mathiyampatti
is a village panchayat in Vennandur Union of Namakkal District.

Sub villages
Mathiyampatti
Sowripalayam
Kattipalayam

Important places
St. Mary Magdalene Church is located at Sowripalayam is a sub village of Mathiyampatti. 
Kattipalayam lake are located in this sub village for fish and water sores of agriculture.
Mathiyampatti Lake are located in this sub village for fish and water sores of agriculture.

References

Villages in Namakkal district

Vennandur_block